The Chaise, also known as the Monthoux, is a 23.8 km long mountain river of eastern France. It flows through the departments Savoie and Haute-Savoie. It is a right tributary of the Arly which it joins in Ugine where, in the mid nineteenth century, it was crossed by a wooden bridge.

References

Rivers of France
Rivers of Savoie
Rivers of Haute-Savoie
Rivers of Auvergne-Rhône-Alpes